Orothalassodes pervulgatus is a species of moth of the family Geometridae. It is found in Pakistan, north-eastern India, Nepal, Thailand, Vietnam, Taiwan and the Philippines (Luzon).

Adults are nearly identical to Orothalassodes falsaria, but lighter blue green. Both wings are densely striated with white.

References

Moths described in 2005
Hemitheini